Katie Wolfe (born 1968) is New Zealand actor and film and stage director. She was in the New Zealand television series Marlin Bay in the 1990s, Shortland Street in the late 1990s and Mercy Peak for two years (2000 - 2001). Her screen directing work has won several awards including Redemption at the ImagineNative Film + Media Arts Festival and This Is Her at the Prague International Short Film Festival. Her current creative work is writing and directing a stage play called The Haka Party Incident, produced by the Auckland Theatre Company and programmed by festivals through New Zealand across 2020 - 2022.

Biography 
Katie Wolfe was born in New Plymouth in 1968, the daughter of Neil and Raewyn Wolfe and has three siblings. She is affiliated with the Taranaki iwi Ngāti Mutunga and Ngāti Tama. In 1986 she enrolled at Victoria University and graduated with a BA in English. She graduated from New Zealand acting school Toi Whakaari in 1990.

Career 
Wolfes first professional acting job was at Dunedin's Fortune Theatre, followed by several episodes of NHNZ's children's nature series Wild Track, as the presenter.

Her first television role was in 1992 as Ginny Gannaway on the series Marlin Bay, a role which lasted three years, and her big screen debut was in The Last Tattoo (1994) directed by John Reid, in which she played the New Zealand missing girlfriend of an American World War II soldier .

Wolfe has directed film and theatre. Her first two short films This is Her and Redemption both premiered at Sundance, and went on to screen in Berlinale, New York and Telluride. Her first feature-length film, titled Kawa, was an adaptation of Witi Ihimaera's book, Nights in the Gardens of Spain.

Wolfe joined seven other Māori women to direct the omnibus film, Waru (2017). Each woman contributed a 10-minute segment of events circling around the tangi of a boy named Waru. After its debut at the 2017 New Zealand International Film Festival, Waru screened at the Toronto Film Festival and ImagineNATIVE festivals.

Live plays Wolfe has directed include The Haka Party Incident a play about race relations based on a true event at Auckland University in 1979 when a group of engineering students doing a mock haka were finally challenged Māori activists. Wolfe also wrote this work and first showed a development of it in 2017. It is programmed in the New Zealand Festival in 2022. It has been programmed by a number of festivals throughout New Zealand (Te Tairāwhiti Festival, Auckland Festival, Tauranga Arts Festival, RESET Festival in Taranaki, Nelson Arts Festival) but has not always been able to be presented due to Covid 19 restrictions.

Filmography - screen credits

Film

Television

Other work

Theatre

Directing 
Wolfe has directed a number of plays including:

 Luncheon (2014) by Aroha Awarau, at the Basement Theatre, Auckland. Starring Jennifer Ward-Lealand
The Haka Party Incident (2017) written and directed by Katie Wolfe. Verbatim theatre, produced by Auckland Theatre Company.
Anahera (2017) by Emma Kinane. Circa Theatre, Wellington.
The Haka Party Incident (2020) (revision) written and directed by Katie Wolfe. Produced by Auckland Theatre Company.

Acting Roles

Awards and nominations

Personal life 
Wolfe married fellow actor Tim Balme in 1994, and together they have two children. Wolfe also has a step-son.

References

External links 

 

1968 births
Living people
New Zealand actresses
New Zealand women film directors
Toi Whakaari alumni
Māori-language film directors